In the United States Mount Independence can refer to:
Mount Independence (Idaho), a mountain in Idaho
Mount Independence (Massachusetts), a summit in Massachusetts
Mount Independence (New York), a summit in Otsego County, New York
Mount Independence (Pennsylvania), a populated place in Pennsylvania
Mount Independence (Vermont), a hill and historic site in Vermont